Lande or Landé is a surname. Notable people with the surname include:

 Alfred Landé (1888 - 1976), German/American quantum physicist
 Jean-Baptiste Landé (died 1748), French ballet dancer, active in Sweden, Denmark and Russia
 Jørn Lande (born 1968), Norwegian heavy rock singer
 Nathaniel Lande, author and filmmaker
 Russell Lande (born 1951), American evolutionary biologist